Christopher Paul Lindstrom (born February 28, 1997) is an American football guard for the Atlanta Falcons of the National Football League (NFL). He played college football at Boston College.

Early years
Lindstrom attended Shepherd Hill Regional High School in Dudley, Massachusetts. He committed to Boston College to play college football.

College career
Lindstrom played at Boston College from 2015 to 2018. During his career he started 49 of 52 games.

Professional career

Lindstrom was drafted by the Atlanta Falcons with the 14th overall pick in the first round of the 2019 NFL Draft. He was named the Falcons starting right guard to start the season. However, in Week 1, Lindstrom suffered a broken foot and was placed on injured reserve on September 9, 2019. He was designated for return from injured reserve on December 2, 2019, and began practicing with the team again. He was activated on December 7, 2019, prior to Week 14.

Lindstrom started all 16 games in the 2020 season, and all 17 games in the 2021 season. In 2021, he allowed 0 sacks all season.

On May 2, 2022, the Falcons exercised the fifth year option on Lindstrom's contract, keeping him in Atlanta through the 2023 season.

On December 21, 2022, it was announced that he would be named to his first Pro Bowl. He was named to the AP All-Pro Second Team on January 13, 2023.

On March 13, 2023, Lindstrom signed a five-year, $105 million contract extension with the Falcons through the 2028 season.

Personal life
Lindstrom's father played at Boston University, and went on to play defensive end for the USFL's Chicago Blitz in 1984. His uncles Eric Lindstrom and Dave Lindstrom also played in the NFL. His younger brother Alec also played for Boston College and was signed by the Dallas Cowboys as an undrafted free agent on April 30, 2022, shortly after the 2022 NFL Draft.

References

External links
Boston College Eagles bio
 
Atlanta Falcons bio

1997 births
Living people
People from Dudley, Massachusetts
Sportspeople from Worcester County, Massachusetts
Players of American football from Massachusetts
American football offensive guards
Boston College Eagles football players
Atlanta Falcons players
National Conference Pro Bowl players